WYRC-LP (92.3 FM) is a radio station licensed to Spencer, West Virginia, United States.  The station is currently owned by Roane County Board of Education.

References

External links
Roane County Schools website
 

YRC-LP
YRC-LP
Contemporary hit radio stations in the United States